In Denmark there are various magazines with different frequency types, including weekly magazines, monthly magazines and quarterly magazines. As in other Nordic countries, the  national consumer organizations publish their magazines in Denmark. In 2007, there were nearly 68 consumer magazines in the country which were mostly owned by Danish media groups. Of them 52 were monthly/quarterly whereas 16 were weekly. These magazines were grouped into four main categories: general-interest magazines, opinion magazines, TV and radio guides, and professional and scientific magazines. 

The following is an incomplete list of current and defunct magazines published in Denmark. They may be published in Danish or in other languages.

0-9
 7 TV-Dage

A

 Aktuel Naturvidenskab
 Alt for Damerne
 Amine

B

Bast Magazine
 Berlingske Tidendes Nyhedsmagasin 
 Billed Bladet
 Bionyt
 Bo Bedre
 Bolius
 Børsens Nyhedsmagasin

C
 Corsaren
 Costume

D

 Dansk
 Dansk Familieblad
 Den danske Spectator
 Det nye Danmark
 Dialog
 Divaani

E
 Erhvervsbladet
 Euroman
 Eurowoman

F

 Faklen
 Familie Journalen
 Femina
 Fjölnir
 Fødevaremagasinet

G
 Gaffa

H

 Helhesten
 Helse 
 Hendes Verden
 Heretica
 Historie
 Historisk Tidsskrift
 Hvedekorn

I
 Idényt
 Illustreret Tidende
 Isabellas

J
 Jodisk Familieblad

K

 Kig Ind
 Klingen
 Kritik
 Kritisk Revy
 Kvinden & Samfundet

L
 Lego Club Magazine

M
 MAK
 Mandag Morgen
 The Murmur

O
 Økonomisk Ugebrev

P

 Panorama in Interlingua
 pcplayer
 Penge og Privatøkonomi
 Politisk Revy
 Punch

R
 Ravnen
 Rotary Norden

S

 Science Illustrated
 Sirene
 Skorpionen
 Søndag
 Svikmøllen

T

 ta’
 Taarnet
 Tilskueren
 Tipsbladet

U
 Ude og Hjemme
 Ugebladet Søndag
 Ugens Rapport

V

 Vennen
 Verden og Vi
 Vi Unge
 Vindrosen

See also
List of newspapers in Denmark

References

Danish
Magazines